Hedayatabad (also Romanized as Hedāyatābād) is a village in Sang Bast Rural District, in the Central District of Fariman County, Razavi Khorasan Province, Iran. At the 2006 census, its population was 507, in 125 families.

References 

Populated places in Fariman County